The following is the incomplete discography of Jimmy Edgar, including albums, EPs, and singles.

Discography

Albums by pseudonym

Solo albums

Compilation albums

EPs

Singles

Remixes

The following is an incomplete list of songs with official remixes released by Jimmy Edgar, in chronological order by remix release:

See also
Jimmy Edgar

References

External links
Jimmy Edgar homepage

Discographies of American artists